Ouachita (also Washita) is an unincorporated community in Dallas County, Arkansas, United States.

Notes

Unincorporated communities in Dallas County, Arkansas
Unincorporated communities in Arkansas
Arkansas placenames of Native American origin